The Other (German: Der Andere) is a 1913 German silent thriller film directed by Max Mack and starring Albert Bassermann, Emmerich Hanus and Nelly Ridon.

Plot
When talking with friends, Dr. Hallers, a well-known lawyer in Berlin, said he was skeptical about fantasies on the split personality: he could never believe something like that. During a ride, however, he has an accident, after which he often falls into a deep sleep from which he awakens with the feeling of having a dual personality. Later, his double starts to rob his apartment with a thief. During the robbery, the police arrives and arrests the thief. Hallers, having fallen asleep, wakes up without remembering anything of what happened. Eventually, the lawyer recovers and marries his fiancée.

Cast
Albert Bassermann as Dr. Hallers
Emmerich Hanus as Judge Arnoldy
Nelly Ridon as Agnes, Arnoldy's sister
Hanni Weisse as Amalie, a housemaid
Léon Resemann as Dickert, a burglar
Otto Colott as Dr. Feldmann, medical advisor
Paul Passarge as Kleinchen, Hallers' secretary
Willy Lengling as Kriminalkommissar Weigert (as C. Lengling)

Other film versions
The Other (August 1930, Germany, directed by Robert Wiene)
The Prosecutor Hallers (November 1930, France, directed by Robert Wiene)
The Haller Case (1933, Italy, directed by Alessandro Blasetti)

References

External links

1913 drama films
German drama films
Films of the German Empire
German silent feature films
Films directed by Max Mack
German films based on plays
German black-and-white films
German thriller films
1910s thriller films
Silent drama films
Silent thriller films
1910s German films